Omar Bahrouzyan Al-Awadhi (born 16 January 1982) is an Emirati tennis player.

Al-Awadhi has a career high ATP singles ranking of 805 achieved on 14 July 2003. He also has a career high ATP doubles ranking of 1005 achieved on 26 May 2003.

Al-Awadhi made his ATP main draw debut at the 2001 Dubai Tennis Championships in the singles draw. Al-Awadhi represents the United Arab Emirates in the Davis Cup.
He received many wildcards at the Dubai Tennis Championships, the last time in 2021, never winning a match.

ATP Challenger and ITF Futures finals

Doubles: 2 (0–2)

External links
 
 
 

1982 births
Living people
Emirati tennis players
Sportspeople from Dubai
Tennis players at the 2002 Asian Games
Asian Games competitors for the United Arab Emirates